Paralaudakia lehmanni, the Turkestan rock agama,  is an agamid lizard found in Turkmenistan, Uzbekistan, Tajikistan, Kyrgyzstan, and Afghanistan.

References

Paralaudakia
Reptiles of Central Asia
Reptiles described in 1896
Taxa named by Alexander Nikolsky